Agnès Spaak (born 29 April 1944) is a French-Belgian actress and photographer. She appeared in more than twenty films since 1962. Her father is screenwriter Charles Spaak and her sister is Catherine Spaak, an actress.

Selected filmography

References

External links 

1944 births
Living people
French film actresses